Igor Maksimovich Maslennikov (born 24 June 2001) is a Russian football player. He plays for PFC Spartak Nalchik.

Club career
He made his debut in the Russian Football National League for FC Shinnik Yaroslavl on 25 May 2019 in a game against FC Avangard Kursk, as a 90th-minute substitute for Vladislav Kamilov.

References

External links
 
 Profile by Russian Football National League
 

2001 births
Footballers from Yaroslavl
Living people
Russian footballers
Association football midfielders
FC Shinnik Yaroslavl players
PFC Spartak Nalchik players
Russian First League players